Port Elizabeth Blackpool (often abbreviated as PE Blackpool) were a South African football club from Port Elizabeth, who played their last season in 1991.

The club originally played in the Federation Professional League before opting into the National Soccer League in 1990.

References

Soccer clubs in South Africa
Sport in Port Elizabeth